The 2016–17 Prairie View A&M Panthers basketball team represented Prairie View A&M University during the 2016–17 NCAA Division I men's basketball season. The Panthers, led by first-year head coach Byron Smith, played their home games at the William Nicks Building in Prairie View, Texas as members of the Southwestern Athletic Conference. They finished the season 13–20, 10–8 in SWAC play to finish in a four-way tie for third place. As the No. 4 seed in the SWAC tournament, they lost to Grambling State in the quarterfinals.

Previous season
The Panthers finished the 2015–16 season 7–24, 7–11 in SWAC play to finish in sixth place. They lost in the quarterfinals of the SWAC tournament to Jackson State.

On January 27, 2016, following a 1–16 start to the season, head coach Byron Rimm II resigned. Assistant coach Byron Smith was named interim coach. On March 14, Prairie View A&M removed the interim coach tag and named Byron Smith head coach.

Roster

Schedule and results

|-
!colspan=9 style=| Exhibition

|-
!colspan=9 style=| Non-conference regular season

|-
!colspan=9 style=| SWAC regular season

|-
!colspan=9 style=| SWAC tournament

References 

Prairie View A&M Panthers basketball seasons
Prairie View AandM